Roger Colman (born 28 January 1951) is an Australian sailor. He competed in the Tornado event at the 1988 Summer Olympics.

References

External links
 

1951 births
Living people
Australian male sailors (sport)
Olympic sailors of Australia
Sailors at the 1988 Summer Olympics – Tornado
Place of birth missing (living people)